WFAV (95.1 FM) is a radio station licensed to Kankakee, Illinois. WFAV has a Contemporary hit radio format and is owned by Milner Media Partners.

History
The station was built by Dennis Baldridge and Richard Shelton, engineers at 89.7 WONU, and originally held the call sign WKVF. As the station was coming on the air, it was sold to Rollings Communications for $90,000. Its call sign was changed to WZZP by the time it began broadcasting in October 1992. The station aired a classic rock format, and was part of a simulcast with 95.3 WZNF in Rantoul, Illinois and 107.9 WZNX in Arcola, Illinois. In 1995, the station was sold to Milner Broadcasting, headed by Tim Milner, for $425,000.

In March 1995, the station adopted an oldies format, branded "The Valley", and the station's call sign was changed to WVLI. The station was simulcast on WFAV 103.7 from the station's sign-on in 2007 until 2011. WFAV 103.7 would end the simulcast and begin airing a CHR format. In August 2012, the station began simulcasting on 92.7 WKIF.

On December 27, 2012, 95.1 began simulcasting the CHR format of 103.7, and "The Valley" oldies format was moved to 92.7. The two stations became known as 95.1 & 103.7 Hit Radio for the Kankakee River Valley. On December 29, 2012, the WKIF calls moved from 92.7 to 95.1 and the WVLI calls moved from 95.1 to 92.7. On February 20, 2013, the station's call sign was changed to WFAV (which moved from 103.7) and its simulcast with 103.7 ended, as 103.7 adopted a classic rock format as WYUR. In 2018, Milner Broadcasting was sold to the newly formed Milner Media Partners.

References

External links
 WFAV's website

Contemporary hit radio stations in the United States
FAV
Radio stations established in 1992
1992 establishments in Illinois